Karamanoğlu Mehmetbey University is a public university in Karaman.

History
Karamanoğlu Mehmetbey University (KMU) is one of new seventeen universities which were established in 2007 by the Turkish Government. However the university’s history dates back the Karaman Vocational School which was established as a part of Selcuk University in 1987. Several other academic units of KMU were established between 1991 and 1997 as a part of Selçuk University including Ermenek Vocational School in 1991, Karaman Faculty of Economics and Administrative Sciences and Vocational School of Health Services in 1992, Kazım Karabekir Vocational School in 1994, Health School of Health Science in 1996 , and School of Physical Education and Sports in 1997. In 2006 and 2007, Faculty of Literature  and Faculty of Kamil Özdağ Science were established as a part of Selçuk University.

All these academic units, which operated under the name of Selçuk University, have transferred to the KMU in 29 May 2007 that is the official establishment date of the KMU.

Karamanoğlu Mehmetbey University, which is currently among the important universities in Turkey with over 17 thousand students, 53 undergraduates,  67 associate degrees and 63 postgraduate (Master and Doctorate degrees) programs and over 1000 academic and administrative staffs, offers important contributions to the higher education community with its extensive campus, laboratories and conference rooms with international standards, modern library, social and sportive facilities. KMU contributes significantly the science especially in the research fields of Turkish language, clean energy, medical technology, food and agriculture  Moreover, it aims to be a favorite higher education institution of people in its region by developing a brotherhood relationship with Balkans, Middle East and African countries.

Academic Units

 Graduate School/Institute of Social Sciences
Graduate School/Institute of Sciences
Graduate School/Institute of Medical Sciences
 Faculty of Literature
 Faculty of Economics and Administrative Sciences
 Kamil Özdağ Faculty Of Science
 Faculty of Engineering
Faculty of Medicine
Faculty of Medical Sciences
Faculty of Sport Sciences
Faculty of Islamic Sciences
Ahmet Keleşoğlu Faculty of Dentistry
Faculty of Education
Faculty of Art, Design and Architecture
 Scientific Research Project Center
 Continuing Education Application and Research Center
 Woman Research Application and Research Center

Notable alumni
 Taha Akgül, Olympic, World, and European champion Turkish freestyle wrestler
 Soner Demirtaş, European champion Turkish freestyle wrestler

Presidents/Rectors

See also
 List of universities in Turkey
 Karaman

References

External links
Karamanoğlu Mehmetbey University website 

Universities and colleges in Turkey
2007 establishments in Turkey
Karaman
Educational institutions established in 2007